This is a list of listed buildings in Moray. The list is split out by parish.

 List of listed buildings in Aberlour, Moray
 List of listed buildings in Alves, Moray
 List of listed buildings in Bellie, Moray
 List of listed buildings in Birnie, Moray
 List of listed buildings in Boharm, Moray
 List of listed buildings in Botriphnie, Moray
 List of listed buildings in Buckie, Moray
 List of listed buildings in Burghead, Moray
 List of listed buildings in Cabrach, Moray
 List of listed buildings in Cullen, Moray
 List of listed buildings in Dallas, Moray
 List of listed buildings in Deskford, Moray
 List of listed buildings in Drainie, Moray
 List of listed buildings in Dufftown, Moray
 List of listed buildings in Duffus, Moray
 List of listed buildings in Dyke And Moy, Moray
 List of listed buildings in Edinkillie, Moray
 List of listed buildings in Elgin, Moray
 List of listed buildings in Findochty, Moray
 List of listed buildings in Forres, Moray
 List of listed buildings in Grange, Moray
 List of listed buildings in Inveravon, Moray
 List of listed buildings in Keith, Moray
 List of listed buildings in Kinloss, Moray
 List of listed buildings in Kirkmichael, Moray
 List of listed buildings in Knockando, Moray
 List of listed buildings in Lossiemouth, Moray
 List of listed buildings in Mortlach, Moray
 List of listed buildings in Portknockie, Moray
 List of listed buildings in Rafford, Moray
 List of listed buildings in Rathven, Moray
 List of listed buildings in Rothes, Moray
 List of listed buildings in Rothiemay, Moray
 List of listed buildings in Speymouth, Moray
 List of listed buildings in Spynie, Moray
 List of listed buildings in St Andrews-Lhanbryd, Moray
 List of listed buildings in Urquhart, Moray

Moray